{{DISPLAYTITLE:C12H18N2O2}}
The molecular formula C12H18N2O2 may refer to:

 Doxpicomine
 Isophorone diisocyanate
 Mexacarbate
 Miotine

Molecular formulas